Herbert Gursky (May 27, 1930, Bronx, New York – December 1, 2006) was the Superintendent of the Naval Research Laboratory's Space Science Division and Chief Scientist of the E.O. Hulburt Center for Space Research.

Biography

Gursky's research activities have concentrated in the area of X-ray astronomy. He has published more than 100 articles in this area and has edited two books on the subject. He was the Principal Investigator for NASA sponsored space programs on the Astronomical Netherlands Satellite and the 1st High Energy Astrophysics Observatory (HEAO-1) satellite and a co-investigator on numerous other rocket and satellite experiments. In addition, Gursky managed research activities encompassing solar physics and magnetospheric research while at AS&E and programs of ground-based astronomy and infrared astronomy at SAO, where he also oversaw the completion of the Multiple Mirror Telescope, a joint program of SAO and the University of Arizona, comprising a 4.5 meter (Equivalent) telescope of novel design that is situated at Mt. Hopkins in Arizona. Gursky's work at the Naval Research Laboratory involved direction of a basic research unit involving 80 Ph.D. scientists conducting investigations in the areas of space astronomy, solar physics and atmospheric science.

Gursky is best known as a member of the group that made the discovery of cosmic X-ray sources in 1961, his work with sounding rockets (he actually launched the June 12, 1962 rocket) that culminated in the optical identification of the bright X-ray source Scorpio X-1 in 1966, and later Cygnus X-1, his work on clusters of galaxies and the diffuse X-ray background from the Uhuru Satellite and the discovery of X-ray bursters on the Astronomical Netherlands Satellite.

Gursky died of gastric cancer.

Education
 University of Florida, B.S., Physics (1951)
 Vanderbilt University, M.S., Physics (1953)
 Princeton University, PhD., Physics (1958)

Positions held
1957-1958 Instructor, Physics Department, Princeton University
1958-1961 Instructor, Physics Department, Columbia University
1961-1970 Senior Scientist, American Science & Engineering. Inc.
1970-1973 Vice President and Director, Space Research Division, American Science & Engineering. Inc.
1970-1973 Associate, Harvard College Observatory
1973-1981 Supervisory Astrophysicist. Smithsonian Astrophysical Observatory
1973-1975 Lecturer on Astronomy. Harvard University
1975-1981 Professor in the Practice of Astronomy, Harvard University
1976-1981 Associate Director, Optical and Infrared Astronomy, Center for Astrophysics  Harvard & Smithsonian
1981-2006 Superintendent, Space Science Division, Naval Research Laboratory
1981-2006 Chief Scientist, E. O. Hulburt Center for Space Research, Naval Research Laboratory
2006 Acting Associate Director of Research for the Naval Research Laboratory's (NRL's) Systems Directorate

Publications
 1975. Neutron Stars, Black Holes and Binary X-Ray Sources. Herbert Gursky (Editor), Remo Ruffini (Editor). D. Reidel Publishing Company. 
 2001. X-Ray Astronomy. Riccardo Giacconi (Editor), Herbert Gursky (Editor). Springer.  .
 2001. Exploring the Universe. Herbert Gursky (Editor), Remo Ruffini (Editor), L. Stella (Editor). World Scientific Publishing Company.

Awards
 NASA Exceptional Scientific Achievement Award
 Naval Research Laboratory Alan Berman Research Publication Award

1930 births
2006 deaths
University of Florida College of Liberal Arts and Sciences alumni
Vanderbilt University alumni
Princeton University alumni
Harvard University faculty
American astronomers
Deaths from stomach cancer
Deaths from cancer in Virginia
Harvard College Observatory people